Lost in Hollywood may refer to:

"Lost in Hollywood", a song by Rainbow on their 1979 album Down to Earth
"Lost in Hollywood", a song by System of a Down on their 2005 album Mezmerize